Windows is a 1980 American thriller film directed by Gordon Willis and starring Talia Shire, Joseph Cortese and Elizabeth Ashley. It was the only film directed by Willis, who is better known as a cinematographer for such films as The Godfather series and several films by Woody Allen.

Plot
Emily Hollander (Shire) is the subject of a lesbian obsession of Andrea Glassen (Ashley), her next-door neighbor.

Emily, a shy, recently divorced woman, lives alone in a New York City apartment. A man forces his way into her apartment and performs a bizarre "rape." He forces her to make sounds of erotic satisfaction, capturing them on his tape recorder. She reports the attack to the police, and while they are interviewing her, Andrea stops by to comfort her.

Emily seeks safety by moving to an apartment in another section of the city. However, while she is moving out, the same man tries to attack her again. This time, Andrea just happens to be visiting Emily, and she is able to prevent the man from entering Emily's apartment.

It soon becomes apparent that Andrea is not the helpful neighbor that she seems. She has the recording that was made during Emily's first attack. Andrea has developed an erotic fascination with Emily. She hired a taxi driver to perform the attacks, with the purpose of gaining the recording, to which she repeatedly listens to and eventually recites while fantasizing of Emily. Unaware of the situation, Emily continues to view Andrea as a friend. She also begins a relationship with the police detective (Cortese) who responded to her case. At this intrusion into her fantasy, Andrea becomes increasingly unhinged. She takes to spying on Emily through a telescope.

When Emily unwittingly hails a taxi driven by the very man who assaulted her, he strikes up a conversation "because you look familiar." She finally realizes who the man is and asks him to stop at a phone booth. She calls the police, who advise her to get back into the taxi and engage the man in harmless conversation until they can arrive to assist her.

With the taxi driver getting arrested and confessing to the entire plot, Emily and Andrea have a confrontation. Andrea professes her love for Emily, but Emily slaps her hard on the face and tells a devastated, weeping Andrea that they never will speak to each other again. Her ordeal over, Emily greets the detective at her front door.

Cast
 Talia Shire as Emily Hollander
 Joe Cortese as Bob Luffrono (as Joseph Cortese)
 Elizabeth Ashley as Andrea Glassen
 Kay Medford as Ida Marx
 Michael Gorrin as Sam Marx
 Russell Horton as Steven Hollander
 Michael Lipton as Dr. Marin
 Rick Petrucelli as Lawrence Obecny
 Ron Ryan as Detective Swid
 Linda Gillen as Police Woman
 Tony DiBenedetto as Nick
 Bryce Bond as Voice Over
 Ken Chapin as Renting Agent
 Marty Greene as Ira
 William Handy as Desk Officer (as Bill Handy)
 Robert Hodge as Desk Sergeant
 Kyle Scott Jackson as Detective
 Pat McNamara as Doorman
 Gerry Vichi as Ben
 Oliver as Jennifer the Cat

Controversy
The film was the subject of many protests from gay rights activists who accused the film of being homophobic and resorting to hateful stereotypes of lesbians. David Denby
attacked the film, writing "Windows exists only in the perverted fantasies of men who hate lesbians so
much they will concoct any idiocy in order to slander them."

Reception
Gene Siskel and Roger Ebert both gave negative reviews for the film alongside other critics like Vincent Canby for The New York Times.

Aftermath
Gordon Willis admitted the film had been a mistake, and later said of directing that he didn't really like it. "I've had a good relationship with actors," he reflected, "but I can do what I do and back off. I don't want that much romancing. I don't want them to call me up at two in the morning saying 'I don't know who I am'".

Home media
Scream Factory released the film on Blu-ray July 4, 2017 with a high-definition transfer from the interpositive and interviews with both actresses and producer along with trailer and TV spots.

Awards and nominations

See also
 List of American films of 1980
 List of horror films of 1980
 Cruising, another 1980 film accused of being homophobic only to be reevaluated as an LGBT classic

References

External links
 
 
 

1980 films
1980 drama films
1980 horror films
1980 thriller films
1980s ghost films
1980s horror thriller films
1980 independent films
1980s mystery films
American LGBT-related films
American psychological horror films
American ghost films
1980s English-language films
Films scored by Ennio Morricone
Films set in New York City
Films shot in New York City
Lesbian-related films
1980 LGBT-related films
United Artists films
1980 directorial debut films
1980s American films